Lithuania–Ukraine relations are foreign relations between Lithuania and Ukraine. Both countries are members of the Lublin Triangle, OSCE, Council of Europe, World Trade Organization and United Nations. Lithuania supports Ukraine's European Union and NATO membership.

History

Ever since the rule of Gediminas in the 1300s much of present-day Ukraine was part of the Grand Duchy of Lithuania. Between 1569 and 1795 Poland and Lithuania formed the Polish–Lithuanian Commonwealth which incorporated much of what is now Ukraine. Following the Partitions of Poland, the bulk of Lithuania and present-day Ukraine fell to the Russian Empire. Both countries formed part of the USSR (Ukraine since 1922, Lithuania since 1944) until 1991.

A number of agreements were signed in November 2009 including the mutual recognition of university qualifications and cooperation in preserving cultural heritage; furthermore, Lithuania promised assistance to Ukraine in its aspirations to become a member of the European Union.

In 2014, the Lithuanian president Dalia Grybauskaitė voiced her support for Ukraine in the wake of the Russo-Ukrainian War. In January 2015, Lithuania requested a United Nations Security Council meeting due to the ongoing conflict in Eastern Ukraine. Later on, Vytautas Landsbergis declared that he believes the Minsk agreement to be "worse than Munich".

In 2021, the Ukrainian President Volodymyr Zelenskyy noted the importance of Lithuania's support for Ukraine's European Union and NATO aspirations, while the Lithuanian President Gitanas Nausėda noted that Lithuania supports Ukraine's progress and welcomes reforms in Ukraine.

Following the start of the 2022 Russian invasion of Ukraine, Lithuania has strongly condemned the invasion and called for military, economic and humanitarian aid for Ukraine. In the prelude of invasion, on 13 February 2022, Lithuania sent FIM-92 Stinger anti-aircraft missile systems and ammunition to Ukraine. Military aid further continued and, according to the Lithuanian Minister of National Defence, as of 21 November 2022, the total aid to Ukraine amounted to €660 million, of which the military aid was €240 million.

Overview
According to the 2016 census, 17,679 ethnic Ukrainians were living in Lithuania, mostly in Vilnius, Kaunas, Klaipėda, Šiauliai, Jonava, and Visaginas. Moreover, Lithuania is a popular destination for the Ukrainian migrants and over 21,800 Ukrainians have work-based residence permits. The Ukrainians evaluate Lithuania positively.

Over 7,000 ethnic Lithuanians are living in Ukraine and are represented by the Lithuanian community of Ukraine organization there. Lithuania consistently supports Ukraine in Russo-Ukrainian War.

Resident diplomatic mission
 Lithuania has an embassy in Kyiv.
 Ukraine has an embassy in Vilnius.

See also
 Embassy of Ukraine in Vilnius
 Foreign relations of Lithuania
 Foreign relations of Ukraine 
 Ukraine–EU relations
 Ukrainians in Lithuania
 Lithuanians in Ukraine
 Accession of Ukraine to the European Union

References

External links
  Lithuanian Ministry of Foreign affairs: list of bilateral treaties with Ukraine (in Lithuanian only)
 Lithuanian embassy in Kyiv (in Lithuanian and Ukrainian only)
  Ukrainian embassy in Vilnius

 

 
Bilateral relations of Ukraine
Ukraine